Rodrigo Pereira do Nascimento (born 26 September 1994) is a Brazilian sprinter. He won a gold medal in the 4 × 100 metres relay at the 2019 IAAF World Relays. In addition, he has won several medals at continental level.

He competed at the 2020 Summer Olympics.

Personal bests
100 m: 10.04 (wind: +0.4 m/s) –  Rio de Janeiro, 22 Jun 2022
200 m: 20.47 (wind: -0.3 m/s) –  Bern, 16 Jun 2018
4x100 m relay: 37.72 –  Doha, 5 Oct 2019

International competitions

1Disqualified in the semifinals
2Disqualified in the final

References

External links

1994 births
Living people
Brazilian male sprinters
Sportspeople from Santa Catarina (state)
Athletes (track and field) at the 2019 Pan American Games
Athletes (track and field) at the 2020 Summer Olympics
Olympic athletes of Brazil
Pan American Games athletes for Brazil
Pan American Games gold medalists for Brazil
Pan American Games medalists in athletics (track and field)
South American Championships in Athletics winners
Universiade bronze medalists for Brazil
Universiade medalists in athletics (track and field)
Medalists at the 2019 Summer Universiade
Medalists at the 2019 Pan American Games
21st-century Brazilian people